The 1982 United States House of Representatives elections in South Carolina were held on November 2, 1982, to select six Representatives for two-year terms from the state of South Carolina.  The primary elections for the Democrats were held on June 8 and the runoff elections were held two weeks later on June 22.  Three incumbents were re-elected, but John Light Napier of the 6th congressional district was defeated in his bid for re-election and the open seat in the 5th congressional district was retained by the Democrats.  The composition of the state delegation after the elections was three Republicans and three Democrats.

1st congressional district
Incumbent Republican Congressman Thomas F. Hartnett of the 1st congressional district, in office since 1981, defeated Democratic challenger W. Mullins McLeod.

Democratic primary

General election results

|-
| 
| colspan=5 |Republican hold
|-

2nd congressional district
Incumbent Republican Congressman Floyd Spence of the 2nd congressional district, in office since 1971, defeated Democratic challenger Ken Mosely.

Democratic primary

General election results

|-
| 
| colspan=5 |Republican hold
|-

3rd congressional district
Incumbent Democratic Congressman Butler Derrick of the 3rd congressional district, in office since 1975, defeated Libertarian challenger Gordon T. Davis.

General election results

|-
| 
| colspan=5 |Democratic hold
|-

4th congressional district
Incumbent Republican Congressman Carroll A. Campbell, Jr. of the 4th congressional district, in office since 1979, defeated Democratic challenger Marion E. Tyus.

General election results

|-
| 
| colspan=5 |Republican hold
|-

5th congressional district
Incumbent Democratic Congressman Kenneth Lamar Holland of the 5th congressional district, in office since 1975, opted to retire.  John M. Spratt, Jr. won the Democratic primary and defeated Republican John S. Wilkerson in the general election.

Democratic primary

General election results

|-
| 
| colspan=5 |Democratic hold
|-

6th congressional district
Incumbent Republican Congressman John Light Napier of the 6th congressional district, in office since 1981, was defeated in his bid for re-election by Democrat Robin Tallon.

Democratic primary

General election results

|-
| 
| colspan=5 |Democratic gain from Republican
|-

See also
United States House of Representatives elections, 1982
South Carolina gubernatorial election, 1982
South Carolina's congressional districts

References

United States House of Representatives
1982
South Carolina